Marc Sánchez (born 6 November 1992) is a Spanish swimmer. He competed in the men's 4 × 200 metre freestyle relay event at the 2016 Summer Olympics.

References

External links
 

1992 births
Living people
Olympic swimmers of Spain
Swimmers at the 2016 Summer Olympics
Place of birth missing (living people)
Mediterranean Games bronze medalists for Spain
Mediterranean Games medalists in swimming
Swimmers at the 2018 Mediterranean Games
Spanish male freestyle swimmers